Kuldip Singh Sahota, Baron Sahota  is a British Labour Councillor for Malinslee & Dawley Bank on Telford and Wrekin Council, who has served as Leader of the council.

Sahota was born in India of Sikh Punjabi heritage, the son of a foundry worker who emigrated to England in 1957, Sahota joining his father in 1966.

Sahota worked for 15 years at the factory of GKN Sankey in Telford before going into full-time political work and going into private business.

Sahota, who had been active in his trade union at work in industry, was elected as Labour Councillor for Malinslee & Dawley Bank on Telford and Wrekin Council.  He served as Leader of the Council between 2011 and 2015.

In October 2022, it was announced that he would receive a life peerage in the 2022 Special Honours. On 2 November 2022, he was created Baron Sahota, of Telford in the County of Shropshire.

Sahota is married to Sukhi and has two sons. He assists in his wife's restaurant business. They live in Ketley, Telford.

In 2019 he wrote and produced a film documentary taking an in-depth look into the Amritsar Massacre of 1919.

References

Living people
Life peers created by Charles III
British politicians of Indian descent
Labour Party (UK) councillors
Labour Party (UK) life peers
Year of birth missing (living people)
Place of birth missing (living people)